9 is the seventh studio album by Danish heavy metal band Mercyful Fate. 9 was recorded during February and March 1999 and was released on 15 June 1999 on Metal Blade Records. This album continues the heavier sound that was introduced in their previous album Dead Again, and also marks the continuation of the Satanic- and occult-based lyrical themes which were prevalent during the band's first incarnation and were reintroduced on the Time (1994) album, as the primary lyrical focus. 9 was Mercyful Fate's last studio album before their twenty-year hiatus from 1999 to 2019.

Track listing

Personnel 
Mercyful Fate
King Diamond – vocals
Hank Shermann – guitar
Mike Wead – guitar
Sharlee D'Angelo – bass
Bjarne T. Holme – drums

Additional musicians
Kol Marshall – keyboards

Production
Kol Marshall – producer, engineer, mixing with Mercyful Fate
Vince Rossi – engineer

References 

1999 albums
9
Metal Blade Records albums